Caleb Alexander, D.D. (1755 – April 1828), a native of Northfield, Massachusetts, and a graduate of Yale University in 1777, was ordained at New Marlborough, Massachusetts, in 1781, and dismissed in 1782. He was again settled at Mendon, Massachusetts, and dismissed in 1803.

After an ineffectual attempt to establish a college at Fairfield, New York, erecting buildings, which now belong to the medical school, he took the charge of the academy at Onondaga Hollow, where he died in April 1828.

He published An Essay on the Real Deity of Jesus Christ: To which are Added Strictures on Extracts from Mr. Emlyn's Humble Inquiry Concerning the Deity of Jesus Christ, 1791; a Latin grammar, 1794; an English grammar, and grammatical elements, the Columbian Dictionary (1800), and Young Ladies and Gentleman's Instructor.

Alexander's 550-page dictionary was said to be the first to include words and language not found or used in England or English dictionaries, but most was recycled material from Dr Johnson and Perry.

References

External links 
 

1755 births
1828 deaths
American Christian clergy
Christian writers
Writers from Syracuse, New York
Yale College alumni
People from Northfield, Massachusetts
People from Fairfield, New York